Don Carey may refer to:

Don Carey (cornerback) (born 1987), American football cornerback
Don Carey (official) (born 1947), official in the National Football League